Natalya Kritinina (born 6 January 2001) is an Uzbekistani swimmer.

In 2018, she competed in the girls' 50 metre freestyle and girls' 100 metre freestyle events at the Summer Youth Olympics held in Buenos Aires, Argentina. In both events she did not advance to compete in the semi-finals. She also competed in the mixed 4 × 100 metre medley relay event.

She represented Uzbekistan at the 2019 World Aquatics Championships held in Gwangju, South Korea. She competed in the women's 50 metre freestyle and women's 100 metre freestyle events. In both events she did not advance to compete in the semi-finals.

She competed in the women's 50 metre freestyle event at the 2020 Summer Olympics held in Tokyo, Japan.

References

External links 
 

Living people
2001 births
Place of birth missing (living people)
Uzbekistani female freestyle swimmers
Swimmers at the 2018 Summer Youth Olympics
Swimmers at the 2020 Summer Olympics
Olympic swimmers of Uzbekistan
21st-century Uzbekistani women